Duinseach ingen Duach, Queen of Tara, fl. 500.

Background

Duinseach was a daughter of Dauí Tenga Uma, King of the Connachta. She was married to King Muirchertach mac Muiredaig (died 532), King of Tara. They were ancestors of the Cenél nEógain.

Battle of Seaghais

Duinseach is said to have been responsible for the battle of Seaghais in 500, where her husband killed her father.

Annalistic account of Seaghais

An account of the battle is given sub anno 499 (sic 500) in the Annals of the Four Masters:

The battle of Seaghais was fought by Muircheartach mac Earca against Duach Teangumha, King of Connaught. The cause of the battle was this, viz.: Muircheartach was a guarantee between the King and Eochaidh Tirmcharna, his brother, and Eochaidh was taken prisoner against the protection of Muircheartach. In proof of which Ceannfaeladh said:

 The battle of Seaghais;
 a certain woman caused it;
 red blood was over lances,
 By Duiseach, daughter of Duach.
 The battle of Dealga, the battle of Mucramha,
 and the battle of Tuaim Drubha,
 With the battle of Seaghais,
 wherein fell Duach Teangumha.

Against the Connaughtmen these battles were gained.

Family tree

     Eochaid Mugmedon
     |
     |___
     |                                             |
     |                                             |
     Brión                                 Niall Noígíallach
     |                                             |
     |                                             |
     Dauí Tenga Uma                         Eógan mac Néill
     |                                             |
     |                                             |
     |                    Muiredach mac Eógain
     |               |                             |
     |               |                             |
     Cú Charainn     Duinseach, alive 500 = Muirchertach mac Muiredaig/Muirchertach mac Ercae
     |                                          |
     |                          |
     Mugain ingen Cú Charainn   |                               |
    =Diarmait mac Cerbaill      |                               |
     |                         Forggus mac Muirchertaig Domnall Ilchelgach, died c. 566.
     |
     Áed Sláine

Cenél nEógain descendants

     Domnall Ilchelgach, died c. 566.
     |
     |__
     |                    |                |
     |                    |                |
     Áed Uaridnach Eochaid Colgo
     |
     |___
     |                                      |
     |                                      |
     Máel Fithrich mac Áedo, d. 630.    Dáre
     |
     |_
     |                                             |
     |                                             |
     Máel Dúin mac Máele Fithrich, died 681.   Máel Tuile (ancestor of Síl Maíle Fithrich)
     |
     |
     Fergal mac Máele Dúin
     |
     |_
     |               |                    |             |
     |               |                    |             |
     Áed Allán Niall Frossach Conchobar Colgu (ancestor of Clann Colgan)
     |               |
     |      _|_
     |      |                       |                 |                       |
     |      |                       |                 |                       |
     |      Áed Oirdnide Colmán Ferchar Muirchertach
     |      |                 (Clann Colmáin) (Muinter Dúin Bó) (a quo Clann Muirchertaich Locha Enaich)
     |      |
     |      |
     |      |                              |                  |                |               |
     |      |                              |                  |                |               |
     |      Niall Caille (died 846) Máel Dúin Fogartach Blaithmac Máel Calland
     |        (issue) (Síl Máela Dúin) (issue) (Úi Duib Enaich)
     |__
     |                                        |
     |                                        |
     Máel Dúin mac Áedo Alláin Cathal (ancestor of Clann Cathail)
     |
     |___
     |                                         |                        |
     |                                         |                        |
     Murchad mac Máele Dúin, fl. 819–833.  Tigernach Flann
     |                                         |                        |
     |                                   Úi Tigernaich     Úi Chellaich & Úi h-Uidir.
     |
     |__
     |                                 |                               |
     |                                 |                               |
     Erulb/Herulfr Ruadrí                          Muiredach
     |                                 |                               |
     |         |___                |
     |                       |         |              |                Úi Flaithbertaich
     |                       |         |              |
     Amlaíb Sartobda Birn Máel Ciaráin
     |                       |         |              |
     |                       |         |              |
     Niall, d.958/964?     Tomrar Muintir Birn   Úi Domnalláin
     |                       |
     |                       |
     Áed Gilla Maire
     |                       |
     |                       |
     Donnchad Tomrar
     d.1014.               d. 1013?
     |
     |
     Máel Colum

Muintir Birn/Byrne of Donegal

     Birn mac Ruadrí mec Murchad mac Máele Dúin
     |
     |___
     |                    |                                   |
     |                    |                                   |
     Anféid Cern Guthmár Donnacán
     |                    |                                   |
     |                    |                                   |
     Tellach n-Anfida Tellach Cruind id est Úi Fergail Tellach n-Donnacáin

External links
 http://www.ucc.ie/celt/published/T100005A/index.html
 
 http://www.ucc.ie/celt/online/G105003/text010.html

4th-century Irish people
5th-century Irish people
Irish princesses
5th-century Irish women
4th-century Irish women